Euthrenopsis venusta is a species of marine gastropod mollusc in the family Buccinidae. It was first described by Baden Powell in 1929. It is endemic to the waters of New Zealand.

Description

Euthrenopsis bountyensis has a shell with six whorls, with strong and even convex outlines.

Distribution
The species is Endemic to New Zealand. The holotype was collected off the coast of the Otago Region, close to Oamaru. Euthrenopsis venusta specimens have also been discovered east of the Otago Peninsula, overlapping with the range of Euthrenopsis otagoensis. Euthrenopsis venusta is the only species from the genus that has been recorded as occurring in the bathyal zone.

References

Further reading
 Spencer, H.G., Marshall, B.A. & Willan, R.C. (2009). Checklist of New Zealand living Mollusca. pp 196–219. in: Gordon, D.P. (ed.) New Zealand inventory of biodiversity. Volume one. Kingdom Animalia: Radiata, Lophotrochozoa, Deuterostomia. Canterbury University Press, Christchurch.

Buccinidae
Gastropods described in 1929
Gastropods of New Zealand
Endemic fauna of New Zealand
Endemic molluscs of New Zealand
Molluscs of the Pacific Ocean
Taxa named by Arthur William Baden Powell